The Furys may refer to:

The Furys (novel), 1935
The Furys (doo-wop group), Jerome Evans & The Furys released singles 1962 - 1974
The Furys (punk band), Los Angeles new wave band formed in the late 1970s

See also
The Fureys, Irish male folk band originally formed in 1976